EES may refer to:

Education 
 Electrical Engineering Society or EES, a popular student chapter in Sardar Vallabhbhai National Institute of Technology, Surat

Government 
 Entry/Exit System, a proposed biometric database in the European Union
 European Economic Senate
 European Employment Strategy

Places 
 Ees (place name), an archaic term for water meadows or firm land adjacent to streams or fens
 Ees, Drenthe, a village in the Netherlands
 Eys, a village in Limburg, Netherlands

Science and medicine 
 Egypt Exploration Society, an archeological society
 Endoscopic ear surgery
 Energy & Environmental Science, a scholarly journal
 Environmental engineering science
 Epidural electrical stimulator, a type of spinal cord stimulator
 Ethinylestradiol sulfonate
 Extended evolutionary synthesis

Technology 
 Engineering Equation Solver, a thermodynamics software package

Other uses 
 EES (rapper) (born 1983), Namibian musician
 Electric Eel Shock, a Japanese rock band
 Enron Energy Services, an American energy distribution company

See also

 
 
 
 ES (disambiguation)
 EE (disambiguation)